Taeniasis-Cysticercosis may refer to different presentations of Taenia-tapeworm infection:
Taeniasis, a general term including asymptomatic cases
Cysticercosis, caused specifically by the parasiteT. solium
Neurocysticercosis, caused when the parasite inhabitis the brain